Michael Aaron Kovaleski (born January 30, 1965) is a former American football linebacker who played for the Cleveland Browns of the National Football League (NFL). He played college football at University of Notre Dame.

References 

1965 births
Living people
People from Union City, New Jersey
Players of American football from New Jersey
American football linebackers
Notre Dame Fighting Irish football players
Tampa Bay Buccaneers players
Cleveland Browns players
Sportspeople from Hudson County, New Jersey